Solitude/Solitaire is the second solo album by former Chicago bassist and vocalist Peter Cetera, and his first album after leaving the band in 1985. It was released in June 1986. The album includes the hits "Glory of Love" and "The Next Time I Fall" (with Amy Grant); both reached the No. 1 position on the Billboard Hot 100 chart. Solitude/Solitaire was produced by Michael Omartian, who later co-produced Cetera's 2001 album, Another Perfect World.

Composition
Cetera co-wrote eight of the nine songs on the album, "The Next Time I Fall" being the exception. Because Cetera had been a prominent songwriter for Chicago, many of the songs on Solitude/Solitaire were rumored to originally have been slated for Chicago 18, especially "Big Mistake" and "Daddy's Girl".

Singles
While "Big Mistake" was due to be the first single from the album, "Glory of Love", co-written by Cetera, David Foster, and Diane Nini, was released instead. That song, from the film The Karate Kid Part II, topped the Billboard Hot 100 and Adult Contemporary charts, and helped Solitude/Solitaire to eventually go platinum. The follow-up single, "The Next Time I Fall", was also a major success and topped the charts. Later singles released from the album included "Big Mistake" and "Only Love Knows Why". The song, "Daddy's Girl," is part of the soundtrack for the 1987 American comedy film, Three Men and a Baby.

Commercial performance
The album was Cetera's greatest solo success, peaking at No. 23 on the Billboard 200 chart. It was certified platinum by the RIAA, selling over one million copies in the U.S.

Solitude/Solitaire marked a high point in Cetera's career, where he achieved success for the first time on his own. It sold more copies than Chicago 18, Chicago's first album without Cetera, which peaked at No. 35.

Track listing
"Big Mistake" (Peter Cetera, Amos Galpin) – 5:39
"They Don't Make 'Em Like They Used To" (Cetera, Erich Bulling) – 4:04
"Glory of Love" (Cetera, David Foster, Diane Nini) – 4:24
"Queen of the Masquerade Ball" (Cetera, Michael Omartian) – 3:50
"Daddy's Girl" (Cetera, Mark Goldenberg) – 3:46
"The Next Time I Fall" (with Amy Grant) (Bobby Caldwell, Paul Gordon) – 3:43
"Wake Up to Love" (Cetera, David Wolinski, Omartian) – 4:29
"Solitude/Solitaire" (Cetera, Omartian) – 4:58
"Only Love Knows Why" (Cetera, George Bitzer, Omartian) – 4:29

Personnel 
Adapted from AllMusic and album liner notes.

 Peter Cetera – vocals
 Michael Omartian – keyboards
 Erich Bulling – synthesizers, drum programming, Yamaha QX-1 computer
 Willie Alexander – Fairlight programming
 Steve Azbill – PPG Waveterm synthesizer programming
 Dann Huff – guitars
 Ray Parker Jr. – guitars on "Wake Up to Love"
 Paul Leim – drums on "Glory of Love" and "Only Love Knows Why"
 Chester Thompson – drums on "The Next Time I Fall"
 Jeff Porcaro – percussion
 Kenny Cetera – additional percussion, additional backing vocals
 Amy Grant – vocals on "The Next Time I Fall"

Production

 Michael Omartian – producer 
 Terry Christian – engineer, mixing
 John Guess – engineer, mixing
 Britt Bacon – second engineer
 Khaliq Glover – second engineer
 Laura Livingston – second engineer
 Ray Pyle – second engineer
 Lion Share Recording Studios, Los Angeles, California – recording and mixing location
 Lighthouse Studios, Studio City, California – recording location
 Skyline Studios, New York, New York – recording location
 Steve Hall – mastering at Future Disc, Hollywood, California
 Herb Ritts – photography
 Jeri McManus – art direction and design

Charts

References

1986 albums
Albums produced by Michael Omartian
Peter Cetera albums
Warner Records albums